2010 Bangalore stadium bombing occurred on 17 April 2010 in M. Chinnaswamy Stadium, Bangalore, India before a 2010 Indian Premier League match between the Royal Challengers Bangalore and Mumbai Indians. Two bombs exploded around a heavily packed Cricket stadium in which fifteen people were injured. A third bomb was defused outside the stadium. According to the Bangalore City Police, the blasts were caused by low-intensity crude bombs made of powergel which is used in quarrying and were triggered by timers. On 18 April, two more bombs were located near the stadium during search operations.

Yasin Bhatkal of the Indian Mujahideen is the prime accused in the case (among 14 others of whom 7 have been apprehended), another accused Mohammad Qateel Siddiqui – also of the Indian Mujahideen – was killed by inmates at the Yerawada Central Jail for his alleged involvement in the attack.

In July, 2018 a National Investigation Agency special court convicted and sentenced 3 of the 14 accused, Gowhar Aziz Khomani, Kamaal Hasan and Mohammad Kafeel Akhtar (all from Bihar), to seven years in jail after they pleaded guilty. They had conspired and facilitated the terrorists who then prepared and planted the explosives.

Background
Bengaluru is the information technology hub of India with more than 40% of the country's IT and software industry based there. Earlier in 2008, Bangalore had suffered serial blasts. India already suffered from a series of blasts in Jaipur, in May 2008.

The bombings 
The stadium was filled with spectators watching a popular cricket tournament. An hour before the start of the match two bombs had exploded and a third bomb was found and defused outside the stadium. According to the witness there was a loud sound and people started running.

After the bomb blast police secured the area following which the Twenty20 cricket match between the home team Royal Challengers Bangalore and Mumbai Indians, started an hour late at (1700 IST).

Casualties 
Initial reports indicated that ten people have been injured. The number of injured later increased to fifteen. Five security men were also among the injured.

Investigations
Preliminary investigations soon after the event showed that a timer device had been used for the bombings. The police commissioner of Bangalore Shankar Bidari said "It is a minor bomb blast, but investigations are in full swing to find out who is responsible".

Abdul Naseer Madani
In Aug 2010, People's Democratic Party chairman Abdul Naseer Madani's admitted involvement in the bombing. Karnataka home minister VS Acharya had said "We are likely to ask for extension Madani's custody. There is an indirect involvement in blast outside Chinnaswamy stadium blast. A clearer picture will emerge in a couple of days. More arrests are likely and inquiry may reveal more names." Madani was arrested on 17 August at Kollam in connection with the 2008 Bangalore serial blasts case.

Impacts 
The Bangalore stadium blasts had necessitated the shifting of two Indian Premier League matches from Bangalore to Mumbai.

See also
 List of terrorist incidents, 2010
 Allegations of state terrorism committed by Pakistan

References

External links 

 Incident Summary at the Global Terrorism Database

Terrorist incidents in India in 2010
2010s in Bangalore
Religiously motivated violence in India
Improvised explosive device bombings in India
History of Karnataka (1947–present)
Manmohan Singh administration
Crime in Bangalore
Islamic terrorism in India
Indian Mujahideen attacks